The 2012 Super Coppa Sammarinese was the first Super Coppa Sammarinese football match. It was contested by Tre Penne, the winner of the 2011–12 Campionato Sammarinese di Calcio, and La Fiorita the winner of the 2011–12 Coppa Titano. The match was held on 3 October 2012 at the Campo di Fiorentino.

Match details

Super Coppa Sammarinese
3